Billy Bob may refer to:
 Billy Bob Thornton 
 Billy Bob Brockali, member of the animatronic robot band the Rock-afire Explosion